The 2021 Ottawa Redblacks season was the seventh season for the team in the Canadian Football League. The Redblacks were eliminated from postseason contention following their week 10 loss to the Hamilton Tiger-Cats on October 23, 2021. This was the second straight season that the Redblacks failed to qualify for the playoffs.

This was the first season for Paul LaPolice as the team's head coach and the seventh season with Marcel Desjardins as general manager, until his dismissal on October 25, 2021.

An 18-game season schedule was originally released on November 20, 2020, but it was announced on April 21, 2021 that the start of the season would likely be delayed until August and feature a 14-game schedule. On June 15, 2021, the league released the revised 14-game schedule with regular season play beginning on August 5, 2021.

Offseason

CFL Global Draft
The 2021 CFL Global Draft took place on April 15, 2021. With the format being a snake draft, the Redblacks selected last in the odd-numbered rounds and first in the even-numbered rounds.

CFL National Draft
The 2021 CFL Draft took place on May 4, 2021. The Redblacks had six selections in the six-round snake draft and had the sixth pick in odd rounds and the fourth pick in even rounds.

Preseason
Due to the shortening of the season, the CFL confirmed that pre-season games would not be played in 2021.

Planned schedule

Regular season

Standings

Schedule
The Redblacks initially had a schedule that featured 18 regular season games beginning on June 11 and ending on October 29. However, due to the COVID-19 pandemic in Canada, the Canadian Football League delayed the start of the regular season to August 5, 2021 and the Redblacks began their 14-game season on August 7, 2021.

 Games played with white uniforms.
 Games played with colour uniforms.
 Games played with alternate uniforms.

Team

Roster

Coaching staff

References

External links
 

2021 Canadian Football League season by team
2021 in Ontario
Ottawa Redblacks seasons